The  is a traditional Japanese festival (also called matsuri) held annually on October 22 in Kyoto, Japan. It is one of Kyoto's renowned three great festivals, with the other two being the Aoi Matsuri, held annually on May 15, and the Gion Matsuri, which is held annually from 17 to July 24. It is a festival enjoyed by people of all ages, participating in its historical reenactment parade dressed in authentic costumes representing various periods, and characters in Japanese feudal history.

Jidai Matsuri traces its roots to the relocation of the Japanese capital from Kyoto to Tokyo during the Meiji Restoration in 1868. This involved the relocation of the Emperor of Japan and the Imperial family, the Imperial Palace, and thousands of government officials and subjects to the new city. To add meaning to the festival, it staged a costume procession representing people of each era in Kyoto history.

The Jidai Matsuri begins in early morning with the mikoshi (portable shrines) brought out of the Kyoto Imperial Palace so that people may pay their respects. The mikoshi represents both Emperor Kanmu and Emperor Kōmei. The five-hour, two-kilometer costume procession begins in the afternoon, with approximately 2,000 performers dressed as samurai, military figures, and common people, from the earliest eras to the Meiji era. These are followed by Japanese women who are dressed in elaborate . Finally, the mikoshi are carried from the palace and are accompanied by a costumed military band that plays the gagaku. The procession ends at the Heian Shrine.

The Jidai Matsuri in 2019 is rescheduled to 26 October due to the Enthronement ceremony of Emperor Naruhito.

References

Cultural festivals in Japan
Festivals in Kyoto
Historical reenactment events
Tourist attractions in Kyoto
Festivals established in 1868
Festivals established in 1895
Arts festivals in Japan
Religious festivals in Japan
Autumn events in Japan